Education Française Bay Area or EFBA (French Education Bay Area) is a French language nonprofit dedicated to promoting a bilingual French education in the San Francisco Bay Area. The organization is modeled after a similar nonprofit in New York, EFNY. With the arrival of COVID-19, EFBA's program have transitioned online. EFBA was founded in 2009.

References

External links 
 EFBA’s Official Website

French language
Education in San Francisco
Educational charities based in the United States
Bilingual schools in the United States
French-American culture in San Francisco
2009 establishments in California